WHRU may refer to:

 WHRU-LP, a low-power radio station (101.5 FM) licensed to serve Huntley, Illinois, United States
 Waste heat recovery unit